Ahli Taiz is a Yemeni football club based in Ta'izz. The club was founded in 1950. 15,000 capacity Al Shohada Stadium is their home.

They play in the Yemeni League.

Achievements
 Yemeni Presidents Cup: 1
 2012
 Yemeni Super Cup: 1
 Runner up 2013

Performance in AFC competitions
AFC Cup: 1 appearance
2013: Group Stage

External links
Ahli Taiz logo

Football clubs in Yemen
1950 establishments in Asia
Establishments in the Kingdom of Yemen